The list of things named Venetian is quite extensive.

Venetian generally describes anything from or related to the Italian city of Venice, or the Veneto region (of which Venice is the capital), or of the Republic of Venice (697–1797), a historical nation in that area. The term may also refer to the Venetian language, a Romance language spoken mostly in the Veneto region.

The term Venetian may also mean from or related to the American city of Venice, Florida, in Sarasota County.

There are many concept names that use the term "Venetian" in those general senses, such as Venetian cuisine, Venetian music, Venetian grammar, etc.  There are however many concepts where "Venetian" has a special sense that cannot be deduced form the general ones.  There are also many people, buildings, and works of art with "Venetian" in their name.

Special senses

History

Venetian Albania (1392–1797), dominion of the Republic of Venice in present south Montenegro and north Albania
Venetian Crete, the Kingdom of Candia (1212–1669), a colony of the Republic of Venice
Venetian Crusade (1122–1124) by the Republic of Venice to the Holy Land
Venetian Dalmatia (1400–1797), dominion of the Republic of Venice in present Croatia
Venetian ducat, a gold ducat coin issued by the Republic of Venice from 1284 to 1797
Venetian grosso, a silver coin minted by the Republic of Venice in 1193
Venetian Interdict, a Papal decree placing sanctions on the Republic of Venice in 1605–1607
Venetian lira, a currency of the Republic of Venice issued from 953 to 1807
Venetian rule in the Ionian Islands (1361–1797), by the Republic of Venice
Venetian Province, a historical province (1797–1815), the former territory of the Republic of Venice 
Venetian rule or Venetocracy (Βενετοκρατία, Venetokratia), the period of Venetian rule in Greece (1212–1669); see Frankokratia

Geography

Venetian Ghetto, the Venice borough where Jews were segregated in 1516; origin of word "ghetto"
Venetian Hills, a neighborhood in southwest Atlanta (GA), USA.
Venetian islands, in the Venetian Lagoon south of Venice
Venetian Islands, Florida (USA), artificial islands between Miami and Miami Beach
Venetian Isles, New Orleans (Îles Vénetiennes), a neighborhood of the city in Louisiana, USA
Venetian Lagoon, the shallow bay on the south side of Venice
Venetian Plain, the flatlands in the Veneto and Friuli regions of Italy
Venetian Slavia or Slavia Friulana, a Slovenian-speaking enclave in the Friuli region of Italy
Venetian Village, Illinois, a census division in Lake County (IL), USA; about 2900 hab in 2010

Styles of arts and crafts

Venetian glass, artistic glass objects from the island of Murano in Venice's bay
Venetian Gothic architecture, a building style developed in Venice in the 1300s
Venetian needle lace, also Venetian point or point de Venise, a type of lace with floral motifs, popular in the 1600s
Venetian painting, a major tradition in Italian Renaissance painting
Venetian polychoral style, a style of choral music from the Baroque and Renaissance
Venetian Renaissance, a period in Venetian history that covered the 15th and 16th centuries
Venetian Renaissance architecture, a style of buildings originated in Venice around 1480
Venetian school (art), a style of painting starting in the 1400s
Venetian School (music), style and composers in Venice from 1550 to 1610

Objects and products

Architecture and furniture

Venetian arch, a usually pointed arch with a band wider at the peak than at the spring
Venetian blind, or Venetian, a common type of window blind similar to Persian blind
Venetian curtain, a type of theater front curtain
Venetian dentil, an architectural ornament; a type of dentil 
Venetian door, a door with narrow sidelights, like a Venetian window
Venetian carpet, a type of inexpensive carpet
Venetian window, a type of window with arched top flanked by two narrow sidelights

Utensils, materials, plants

Venetian ball, a ball of glass with enclosed objects, often used as paperweight
Venetian blind shades or shutter shades, sunglasses with horizontal slats instead of lenses
Venetian chalk, a white compact talc or steatite used especially for marking on cloth
Venetian mask, a special variety traditionally worn in the Carnival of Venice
Venetian plaster, a type of polished plaster including marble dust
Venetian pearl, an imitation pearl made of solid glass
Venetian-style shoe, or Venetian loafer, a plain mid-heel slipper
Venetian soap, made with olive oil
Venetian sumac or smoke tree (Cotinus abovatus)
Venetian swell, a swell organ with blinds patterned closing the swell box

Colors, pigments, and varnishes

Venetian blue, same as cobalt blue
Venetian ceruse, a lead-based white cosmetic face paint used in the 1600s and 1700s
Venetian green, a bluish dark green color
Venetian lake, a red painter's pigment or shade or carmine (color)
Venetian red, a painter's pigment
Venetian rose, a shade of pink
Venetian scarlet, a shade of red
Venetian turpentine or Venice turpentine, an artists' varnish from larch (Larix decidua) resin
Venetian white, a painter's pigment, mix of lead white and barium sulfate
Venetian yellow or amber yellow, a shade of yellow

Other
Venetian Carnival, or the Carnival of Venice, a traditional festivity since the 12th century
Venetian Festival, any modern costume festivity inspired on the historic carnival of Venice
Hythe Venetian Fete, a traditional carnival of Kent, England
Venetian Mafia, called Mala del Brenta, a criminal organization in Veneto

In titles and names

Buildings and structures

Venetian Arena, former name (2008–2010) of the Cotai Arena in Macao, China.
Venetian arsenal, Gouvia, built by the Republic of Venice in Corfu (Greece) 1400s or 1500s
Venetian Bay Resort, a development and resort in Kissimmee (FL), USA
Venetian Causeway, a bridge connecting Miami Beach to mainland Miami (FL), USA
Venetian Court, a seaside resort in Capitola (CA), USA
Venetian Garden, Leesburg, a park in Lake County (FL), USA
Venetian Golf and River Club, in North Venice (FL), USA
Venetian House (Sighișoara), a building from the 1500s in Sighișoara, Romania
The Venetian Las Vegas, a resort hotel and casino in Las Vegas, Nevada
The Venetian Macao, a hotel and casino in Macau, China
Venetian Pool, a historic public swimming pool built in 1924 in Coral Gables (FL), USA
Disney's Venetian Resort, a project of the late 1960s for Disney World (FL, USA) that was never built.
Venetian Theatre, a former theater in Hillsboro, Oregon, USA
The Venetian Theater, a building in the Caramoor Center for Music and the Arts, near Katonah, New York USA
Venetian Village, Naples, Florida, a waterside shopping district in USA
Venetian Waterway Park, a 9.3 mile scenic bike path built ca. 2002 in Sarasota County, near Venice (FL), USA

Books and plays

The Anonymous Venetian (novel), a book by Donna Leon
The Venetian, or The Venetian Woman, or The Venetian Comedy, originally La veniexiana (play), comedy play in Venetian language, 1535–1537
 The Venetian Affair (novel), 1963 novel by Scottish-American author Helen MacInnes
 The Voyages of the Venetian Brothers Nicolò and Antonio Zeno to the Northern Seas in the XIVth Century, account of the travels of the Zeno brothers , edited by R. H. Major, 1873 
Venetian Masque, a 1935 English adventure novel by Rafael Sabatini
The Venetian Nights (Les noces vénitiennes), a 1924 novel by Abel Hermant published by Ferenczi
The Venetian Twins (I due gemelli veneziani), a 1747 theater play by Goldoni 
The Venetian Twins (musical), a 1979 Australian musical comedy play by Enright and Clarke
The Venetians, 1892 novel by Mary Elizabeth Braddon

Movies
The Anonymous Venetian (film) (Anonimo veneziano), a 1970 Italian drama by Enrico Maria Salerno
A Holy Venetian Family (Leoni), a 2015 Italian comedy movie by Pietro Parolin
The Venetian (film) (Venetianskan), a 1958 TV movie directed by Ingmar Bergman
The Venetian Affair (film), 1967 American movie
Venetian Bird, a 1952 British thriller movie directed by Ralph Thomas
Venetian Honeymoon (La prima notte, Les noces vénitiennes), 1959 Italian-French comedy movie by Cavalcanti
Venetian Lovers, 1925 British silent film by Niebuhr and Tilley
Venetian Nights (Nuits de Venise), a 1931 German operetta movie by Billon and Wiene
The Venetian Woman (La venexiana), 1986 Italian erotic film by Mauro Bolognini

Paintings

Portrait of a Venetian by Tintoretto, ca. 1550 
Portrait of a Venetian Admiral by Tintoretto, 1570s 
Self-Portrait as Venetian Ambassador, by Bernardo Bellotto, 1765 
Pavel Sorokoumskiy as Venetian Doge, unknown painter, late 1800s 
The Venetian Girl by Frank Duvenek, ca. 1880 
Head of a Venetian Girl by Giorgione, 1509 
A Venetian Lady from the House of Barbarigo by Rosalba Carriera, 1735–1740 
Portrait of a Venetian Man by Jan van Scorel, ca. 1520 
Portrait of a Venetian Nobleman by Peter Paul Rubens, 1620s 
Venetian Nobleman by Tintoretto, 1590s 
Portrait of the Venetian Painter Giovanni Bellini by Tizian, 1511–1512 
Portrait of a Venetian Senator, by Tintoretto, ca. 1570 
The Venetian Shoe Black (Lustrascarpe veneziano), tinted photo by Carlo Ponti, 1867 
Portrait of a Venetian Woman, by Paolo Veronese, late 1500s 
Portrait of a Venetian Woman, or Madonna delle rose, by Tintoretto, 1597–1600 
Portrait of a Venetian Woman, a 1505 painting by Albrecht Dürer
Portrait of a Venetian Woman, or La Belle Nani, by Paolo Veronese

People and spirits
Venetian Chohan, or Paul the Venetian, an entity in the teachings of Theosophy
The Reliable Venetian Hand, an anonymous art collector from the 1700s
VenetianPrincess, pseudonym of Jodie-Amy Rivera (1984–), American internet video personality
Venetian Snares, stage name of Aaron Funk (1975–), Canadian electronic musician
The Venetians (Australian band), a mid-1980s pop music band

Political parties and movements
Venetian nationalism, a political movement
Party of the Venetians (Partito dei Veneti, PdV), an ephemeral party (Jan–Sep 2010)
Venetian Agreement (Intesa Veneta), a party (2006–)
Venetian League or Liga Veneta, Łiga Vèneta, a party (1979–)
Venetian Left (2013) (Sanca Veneta, SV), a party (2013–)
Venetian National Liberation Movement (Movimento di Liberazione Nazionale del Popolo Veneto, MNLV), an independence movement (2009–)
Venetian National Party (Partito Nasional Veneto, PNV), a former party (2007–2011)
Venetian People's Unity (Unitá Popolare Veneta, UPV), a party (2008–)
Venetian People's Movement (Movimento Popolare Veneto, MPV), a former party (2008–2015?)
Union of the Venetian People (Unione del Popolo Veneziano, UPV), a former party (1995–1999)

Other

Venetian Arts Society, a  not-for-profit organization in Fort Lauderdale (FL), USA
Penny Venetian Red, a British postage stamp issued in 1880–1881
Venetian Way (1957–1964), a racehorse, winner of the 1960 Kentucky derby

See also
 Friulan and Giulian, related to or from Friuli Venezia Giulia region of Italy
 Venice (disambiguation)
 Veneti (disambiguation)
 Venetia (disambiguation)

References

Venice